The Arghistan or Arghastan  is a river in southern Afghanistan. It flows through Arghistan District and the provinces of Zabul and Kandahar. It is a tributary of the Dori River, a sub-tributary of the Helmand River.

Geography 
The river rises in the south-eastern Afghanistan, in the province of Zabul, near the border of Pakistan.
Shortly after its start, the Arghastan adopts towards a west-southwest course. In its lower course, its waters are widely used to irrigate the oases of Kandahar, and its flow is greatly reduced. The average annual flow or module of the river is  near the town of Kandahar.

The Lora River (not to be confused with the Dori River, also known as the Lora River in its upper reaches) is a tributary from the northeast with its headwaters near Ab-i Istada. It joins the Arghastan on its right bank in its lower reaches.

Notes and references

External links 
 Integrated Water Resources Management for the Sistan Closed Inland Delta, page 9 and Watershed Map of Afghanistan (page 18)

Rivers of Afghanistan
Landforms of Kandahar Province
Landforms of Zabul Province